Death is My Trade is a 1977 German film, which is based on the script of director Theodor Kotulla starring Götz George in the leading role. The realisation of the script is based on the French novel La mort est mon métier by Robert Merle, which was published in 1952 (English edition: Death Is My Trade).

Like the novel, the film is partly based on interrogation records of the trial against Rudolf Höß, SS-officer and commander of the Nazi concentration and extermination camp Auschwitz, as well as on his autobiographical notes. He made these notes first during his time as British POW, then, after he was extradited, as Polish prisoner in 1946/47, before he was executed as a convicted war criminal. Instead of using the name Rudolf Höß, whose life was the model for the film, the pseudonym Franz Lang is used, in order that he remain anonymous. The real Rudolf Höß had gone into hiding allegedly working as a boatman after World War II using this (fake) name until he was unmasked and arrested in 1946.

The film is divided into 14 different episodes, which describe fragmentary and important scenes of Franz Lang's (alias Rudolf Höss) life.

Cast
 Götz George as Franz Lang
 Hans Korte as Heinrich Himmler

Plot 
Franz Lang, born in 1900, tries to get to the front line during World War I when he is a teenager - at first unsuccessfully. Finally, he volunteers to work at a military hospital, where he gets to know injured Hauptmann Günther. In their interactions, the German Army officer explains to him the only sin: not being a "good German" - a key sentence for Lang and his future life. The officer promises young Franz to take him into his newly founded regiment.

In 1917 Franz Lang serves at the front, which he had long desired, under the command of Captain Günther: Joining three of his comrades Franz is to take machine gun position and has to experience the death of two of his comrades. The third tries to convince Franz of desertion, but he wants to fulfill the wish of his group leader, who had just died, to stay in machine gun position as long as possible, and so kills the deserter. Severely wounded carrying his machine gun Franz Lang drags himself behind the front line, where he is found unconscious by Captain Günther. Later he promotes him to the rank of non-commissioned officer, as Franz Lang is the only survivor of the hopeless battle.

Even after the war, during the Weimar Republic Lang maintains his devotion to duty and subservience to authority which is why he often gets into trouble in civil life: In 1919 he finds work in a machine factory with the help of a comrade, but soon he gets fired after a conflict with his elderly college, who struggles with Lang's pace of work, following pressure from the staff and the worker's council.

After his dismissal Franz Lang gets involved in national circles. As a result, he joins the extreme right-wing , which intervenes at the Ruhr Uprising against left-wing revolutionary workers in the Baltic states and at other occasions. In a group of arrested insurgents, he recognizes a former wartime comrade, who Lang supports at first. He points out at his commander that his comrade was very committed at the front and that he was awarded the Iron Cross. The commander of the unit convinces Franz Lang that they are communists and that he cannot relate to them as comrades anymore. He says that they are ideologically blinded by "Jewish-Marxist agitators" and that orders are always binding and have to be carried out even against personal interests. Franz Lang is finally content with this explanation and when his former comrade later tries to flee, he shoots him.

After the dissolution of the Freikorps Lang finds a job as a construction worker. He uses his first wage in order to pay his debts to his comrades, and so he has hardly any money left to live off. In addition, he is overwhelmed by the physical effort so much that he, under the impression that he isn't able to fulfill his obligation, despairs. Lang decides to end his own life on his own terms. Before he shoots himself with his Mauser pistol, one of his fellow construction workers visits him: He instantly guesses what Lang is about to do and warns him to stay loyal to Germany and that he is burdened with the responsibility for this country, even though he may no longer be a soldier. Lang's colleague, whom Lang suspects to be a member of the NSDAP, leaves him with a pamphlet called Völkischer Beobachter. Impressed by the fighting talk used in the pamphlet, Franz Lang decides to join the NSDAP, too.

In 1922 Franz Lang visits a (Sturmlokal) belonging to the local SA: He tells the SA-Obersturmführer that he wants to have responsibility and help Germany rise to power again. As he is filling in the form required for a member ID card and admission, the 'Obersturmführer' explains to him that he has been accepted into the SA and that he would receive a preliminary ID card, as he is related to Roßbach. Lang assures him that he absolved all the combat missions after the war. However, he couldn't afford a SA-Uniform. The SA leader in response to this leaves him with the uniform of a SA man who was shot.

As a member of the NSDAP and SA, Franz Lang responds to a call for a group of soldiers, from a couple of landlords who want their land protected.

Franz Lang is stationed there, together with a couple of his comrades, when the former treasurer of the Freikorps appears in town. He had stolen the free corps funds several years earlier, run off, but now appeared in Mecklenburg. During a drinking session Franz Lang uncovers the alleged Communist Party of Germany|KPD membership of one former free corps comrade. The free corps members present at the meeting abduct and beat up the alleged traitor in a forest and Franz Lang shoots him. One frightened person involved in the murders reveals the crime to the authorities and in 1924 Franz Lang is sentenced to ten years in prison. In prison he reads Hitler's "Mein Kampf" and becomes a fanatic Nazi. After almost five years, Lang is released in 1928 as a result of an Amnesty.

In his social reintegration the NSDAP helps him in finding employment on the land of a party friend: the former colonel Baron of Jeseritz. He is soon very impressed by Lang's services and supports him further: He leaves him with a neglected farm that he may autonomously administer and advises him to marry Else, who was chosen by the baron himself, because she conforms to Aryan female standards. Lang does as he is told and marries Else. At a party held later at the farm he meets Heinrich Himmler, who claims to have heard of Lang's reliability and organisational skills. Franz Lang receives an order from Himmler himself to organise a cavalry division, which is later to become the Schutzstaffel.

When the National Socialists gain power over the Republic, Lang becomes an Unterscharführer with the SS riders, and in 1934 SS Reich leader Himmler offers him an administrative post at the Dachau concentration camp close to Munich. Even though he and his wife would prefer to carry on working in agriculture, Lang accepts the offer as a "commitment to the party and the homeland" which Himmler approves. Lang points out to his wife that the SS Reich Leader had chosen him particularly because of these organisational skills and his experience as a prisoner. After all, he himself had been imprisoned for five years.

In the Dachau concentration camp Franz Lang is finally trained to be the future camp commander. He fulfils his duties without protest and, as years go by, he is promoted to the rank of SS-Sturmbannführer. During World War II Lang is once again summoned to Himmler who informs him, under strict confidentiality, about Hitler's plan to annihilate the Jews in the holocaust and about the camps, which are planned in Poland. As a result, Lang takes over the Auschwitz extermination camp in Poland, which is now occupied by the Germans. Adolf Eichmann informs him about the "capacities" of the camp. Until then, according to the party leadership the killings were too ineffective. More or less incidentally, Lang develops the idea of using the poison cyclone B as a "hygienically clean" and "effective" solution to gas the Jews who are deported to Auschwitz. Because he implements this method successfully in the camp, he is promoted to the rank of SS-Obersturmbannführer after Himmler has visited him there.

During a meal with the head of the Chelmno concentration camp Lang's wife Else finds out what is going on in the camp and when she tackles him, he defends himself by saying it is his duty. He does not contradict his wife when she assumes that he would also kill their children if he was told to. He even admits that he would do so. He argues that he is not responsible for what he does in the camp, as he is following orders given by his superiors.

At the end of the war Lang hides out at a farm in the American occupation zone. He is found by American soldiers and subsequently imprisoned. During an interrogation, when Lang is asked by a US officer whether he thinks that the eradication of the Jews was right, he says: "It is not relevant what I believe, I only obeyed."

Franz Lang is extradited to Poland where he is sentenced to death and subsequently hung in Auschwitz.

References

External links
 

1977 films
1970s biographical films
1970s war films
German biographical films
German war films
Holocaust films
Films based on French novels
Films set in the 1920s
Films set in the 1930s
Films set in the 1940s
German prison films
German World War II films
1970s German-language films
1970s German films